Craven may refer to:

 Craven in the Domesday Book, an area of Yorkshire, England, larger area than the district
 Craven District, a local government district of North Yorkshire formed in 1974

Places
 Craven, New South Wales, Australia, see Mid-Coast Council#Towns and localities
 Craven, Saskatchewan, Canada, a village
 Craven (Bradford ward), an electoral ward in the Bradford Metropolitan District, West Yorkshire, England
 Craven, North Carolina, United States, see Gold Hill, North Carolina
 Craven, South Dakota, United States, see Aberdeen, South Dakota micropolitan area#Communities
 Craven Arms, Shropshire, England
 Craven County, North Carolina, United States
 Craven County, South Carolina, a former county in the United States

Organisations
 Cravens, a British railway rolling stock builder
 Craven Brothers, a British manufacturer of machine tools and cranes
 Craven College, North Yorkshire, England
 Craven Community College, with three campuses in North Carolina, US
 Craven Laboratories, a defunct American pesticide testing laboratory

Ships
 USS Craven (TB-10), a torpedo boat commissioned in 1900 and decommissioned in 1913
 USS Craven (DD-70), a destroyer commissioned in 1918 and scrapped in 1945
 USS Craven (DD-382), a destroyer commissioned in 1937 and decommissioned in 1945

Other uses
 Craven (surname)
 Earl of Craven, also Baron Craven, a title in English peerage
 Craven baronets, two extinct baronetcies, one in the Baronetage of England and the other in the Baronetage of the United Kingdom
 Craven Country Jamboree, a music festival, Craven, Saskatchewan, Canada

See also
 Craven A and Craven, cigarette and tobacco brands produced by The House of Craven
 Craven Berkeley (1805–1855), British politician
 Craven Cottage, a sports stadium and home of Fulham F.C. in London, England
 Craven Fault System, a fault zone in northern England
 Craven Park (disambiguation)
 Craven Plate, an Australian thoroughbred horse race 
 Craven Stakes, a British horse race